Orybina plangonalis is a moth of the family Pyralidae. It was described by Francis Walker in 1859 and is known from northern India and Taiwan.

References

Moths described in 1859
Pyralinae